Line 14 of the Guangzhou Metro is a rapid transit line in Guangzhou. Like Line 21, Line 14 is a rapid suburban metro line envisioned to promote development in Guangzhou's northeast regions. To facilitate rapid movement between the city center and the outlying district of Conghua within one hour, unlike other pre-existing Guangzhou Metro lines, Line 14 contains passing loops at some stations to allow for express stopping patterns. These considerations will allow for passengers to travel from outer Guangzhou to the city center in one hour. Line 14 features two separate services. The Knowledge City Line, originally a branch line, is now a standalone service. Passengers can use a cross-platform interchange between the Line 14 mainline and Knowledge City line at Xinhe station.

An extension to Guangzhou railway station is currently underway. And there are plans to split the Knowledge City branch line to be Line 27.

History

The first stage of Line 14, named the Knowledge City Line, was the section between Xinhe and Zhenlong. It opened on 28 December 2017, at which time there were no connections between it and the rest of the Guangzhou Metro network. The section between Jiahewanggang and Dongfeng opened on 28 December 2018. The southern extension, from Jiahewanggang to Guangzhou railway station, began construction in October 2018.

Train service
There are 3 types of train services offered on the metro line 14:

  —  (Mainline local services, stop at every stations on mainline)
  —  (Mainline rapid express services, only stop at Jiahewanggang, Baiyun Dongping, Xinhe, Conghua Coach Terminal, Dongfeng)
  —  (Branch line local services, stop at every stations on branch line)

Stations
 L - local services
 R - rapid express services
 BL - branch line local services

Southern extension
Under Construction

References

14
Railway lines opened in 2017